The Château du Grand-Geroldseck is a ruined medieval castle situated in the commune of Haegen in the Bas-Rhin département in Alsace, France. It was  listed as a monument historique by the French Ministry of Culture in 1898.

History
The castle is one of the oldest in the northern Vosges, founded at the beginning of the 12th century by the lords of Geroldseck, avoués of the abbey of Marmoutier, to ensure the protection of its territories. It constitutes a fine collection of feudal residence. Built on a platform, it combined the functions of dwelling and defence. It was heavily altered at the 13th, 14th and 15th centuries.

Description
The square keep has walls three metres thick, faced in embossed stone. The cellars of the lord's residence and the barbican are still visible.

See also
 List of castles in France

External links

References

Buildings and structures completed in the 12th century
Ruined castles in Bas-Rhin
Monuments historiques of Bas-Rhin